Satoru Arai (born 29 June 1947) is a Japanese luger. He competed in the men's singles and doubles events at the 1972 Winter Olympics.

References

External links
 

1947 births
Living people
Japanese male lugers
Olympic lugers of Japan
Lugers at the 1972 Winter Olympics
Sportspeople from Tochigi Prefecture
20th-century Japanese people
21st-century Japanese people